8 Nëntori  is a Communist newspaper published in Albania. Its name is the foundation date of the first Communist Party of Albania, on 8 November 1941.

References

Defunct newspapers published in Albania
Albanian-language newspapers